Acacia wickhamii is a shrub belonging to the genus Acacia and the subgenus Juliflorae that is endemic to parts of northern Australia.

Description
It has an erect to low spreading habit and mostly branches from or near base. The bark is smooth or finely fissured and is often a grey colour. The glabrous angular branchlets usually with resin-crenulated ridges. It blooms from March to July or in September and produces yellow flowers. The thin brown woody seed pods that form after flowering have a narrowly oblanceolate to narrowly elliptic to linear shape.

Taxonomy 
The species was first formally described by the botanist George Bentham in 1842 as part of William Jackson Hooker's work Notes on Mimoseae, with a synopsis of species as published in the London Journal of Botany. It was reclassified as Racosperma wickhamii by Leslie Pedley in 1987 then transferred back to genus Acacia in 2006.

There are four known subspecies;
Acacia wickhamii subsp. cassitera
Acacia wickhamii subsp. viscidula
Acacia wickhamii subsp. parviphyllodinea
Acacia wickhamii subsp. wickhamii

Distribution
It is native to an area in the Kimberley region of Western Australia where it is found along the banks of watercourses and on stony plains growing many soil types over or around sandstone and shale. It is also found across the Barkly Tableland and Katherine regions of the Northern Territory and northern Queensland.

See also
 List of Acacia species

References

wickhamii
Acacias of Western Australia
Flora of Queensland
Flora of the Northern Territory
Taxa named by George Bentham
Plants described in 1842